Toula (Arabic: تولا ) is a village in Batroun District, North Governorate, Lebanon, 15 km far from Batroun. Situated at an altitude ranging from 460 meters above sea level at its lowest point, to 760 metres. It is known for its olive oil and figs. The residents are Christians. Its St-Doméce's (Mar Doumit) parish church dates back to 1270, it was restored in 1921 and has beautiful stone vaults inside. There are also the Slayyeb church and Mar Aabda's church.

Geography 
 Elevation: 650 m
 Distance from Beirut: 61 km
 Distance from Tripoli: 43 km
 Distance from Batroun: 15 km

External links
http://www.localiban.org/article3719.html

Batroun District
Populated places in the North Governorate
Maronite Christian communities in Lebanon